Crangonyx is a genus of crustacean in family Crangonyctidae.  Crangonyx species can live in marshes, savannas or swamps as well as caves.  It contains the following species:  

Crangonyx aberrans S. I. Smith, 1983
Crangonyx acicularis Zhang & Holsinger, 2003
Crangonyx africanus Missouli, 2006
Crangonyx aka Zhang & Holsinger, 2003
Crangonyx alpinus Bousfield, 1983
Crangonyx anomalus Hubricht, 1943
Crangonyx antennatus Cope & Packard, 1881
Crangonyx arsenjevi (Derzjavin, 1927)
Crangonyx baculispina Zhang & Holsinger, 2003
Crangonyx barri Zhang & Holsinger, 2003
Crangonyx bousfieldi Zhang & Holsinger, 2003
Crangonyx caecus Zhang & Holsinger, 2003
Crangonyx castellanum Zhang & Holsinger, 2003
Crangonyx chlebnikovi Borutzky, 1928
Crangonyx consimilis Zhang & Holsinger, 2003
Crangonyx cooperi Zhang & Holsinger, 2003
Crangonyx cornutus Zhang & Holsinger, 2003
Crangonyx dearolfi Shoemaker, 1942
Crangonyx disjunctus Zhang & Holsinger, 2003
Crangonyx ermannii (Milne-Edwards, 1840)
Crangonyx floridanus Bousfield, 1963
Crangonyx fontinalis Zhang & Holsinger, 2003
Crangonyx forbesi (Hubricht & Mackin, 1940)
Crangonyx gracilis S. I. Smith, 1871
Crangonyx grandimanus Bousfield, 1963
Crangonyx hobbsi Shoemaker in Ellis, 1941
Crangonyx hubrichti Zhang & Holsinger, 2003
Crangonyx indianensis Zhang & Holsinger, 2003
Crangonyx insolitus Zhang & Holsinger, 2003
Crangonyx islandicus Svavarsson & Kristjánsson, 2006
Crangonyx lewisi Zhang & Holsinger, 2003
Crangonyx longicarpus Zhang & Holsinger, 2003
Crangonyx longidactylus Zhang & Holsinger, 2003
Crangonyx minor Bousfield, 1958
Crangonyx montanus Zhang & Holsinger, 2003
Crangonyx obliquus (Hubricht & Mackin, 1940)
Crangonyx occidentalis Hubricht & Harrison, 1941
Crangonyx ohioensis Zhang & Holsinger, 2003
Crangonyx orientalis Zhang & Holsinger, 2003
Crangonyx packardi S. I. Smith, 1888
Crangonyx palustris Zhang & Holsinger, 2003
Crangonyx paxi Schellenberg, 1942
Crangonyx pseudogracilis Bousfield, 1958
Crangonyx richmondensis Ellis, 1941
Crangonyx rivularis Bousfield, 1958
Crangonyx serratus (Embody, 1910)
Crangonyx setodactylus Bousfield, 1958
Crangonyx shoemakeri Hubricht & Mackin, 1940
Crangonyx specus Zhang & Holsinger, 2003
Crangonyx stagnicolous Zhang & Holsinger, 2003
Crangonyx subterraneus Bate, 1859

References

Gammaridea
Malacostraca genera
Taxa named by Charles Spence Bate
Taxonomy articles created by Polbot